The Bugaloos is an American children's television series, produced by brothers Sid and Marty Krofft, that aired on NBC on Saturday mornings from 1970 to 1972. Reruns of the show aired in daily syndication from 1978 to 1985 as part of the "Krofft Superstars" package with six other Krofft series. The show features a musical group composed of four British teenagers in insect-themed outfits, constantly beset by the evil machinations of the talent-challenged Benita Bizarre, played by comedian Martha Raye.

Premise
The show takes place in the fantasy setting of Tranquility Forest. The central characters are a popular band of teenage musicians named the Bugaloos, who wear insect-themed outfits with wings/antennae and can fly using their wings (although they are occasionally shown flying on leaves that resemble surfboards). Though peace-loving and hippie-like, the Bugaloos are pursued by an ugly, evil, jealous old crone named Benita Bizarre, who lives in a gigantic jukebox and uses it to broadcast her own brand of blaring, obnoxious, unpleasant "music". A dreadful singer, Benita is furious at the popularity of the Bugaloos' more melodic, upbeat sound and she plots elaborate, unsuccessful schemes to either destroy or enslave them. She frequently makes use of a powerful ultrasonic weapon called the Stereo Zapper, which can render its victim unconscious in seconds. The Bugaloos are sometimes seen traveling around in their "Bugaloo Buggy", a colorful dune buggy custom-made for the show by car builder George Barris.

Production and airing

Touted as the British version of The Monkees, The Bugaloos attracted more than 5,000 young actors and actresses to audition in spring 1970 for the show's four lead roles, each having to demonstrate aptitude in dance, singing and acting.

Among those auditioning were Elton John's future manager John Reid and Phil Collins, who joined the art rock band Genesis later that year. Reid and Collins were two of the three finalists for the role of "I.Q." given to Scottish musician John McIndoe. "If one of those guys had gotten it instead of me, rock-'n'-roll history might have changed," McIndoe later joked. "Whenever I see them, I say, 'Hey guys, you were lucky you didn't get the part'."

The show was taped in Los Angeles, California. Seventeen episodes of the series were produced. Like its predecessor, H. R. Pufnstuf (1969), The Bugaloos ran for only one season (1970–1971) on NBC, with reruns airing the following year (1971–1972). Following production of the first season, the Kroffts tried shooting for a second season and also had a movie deal in the works with Columbia Pictures. However, miscommunication with the actors resulted in their returning to the UK that December against the Kroffts' wishes. As a result, a potential second season was ultimately scrapped, along with plans for a movie which was shelved due to the bankruptcy of Columbia Pictures.

Although the show featured British actors, it was not screened in the U.K.

The Bugaloos was fitted with an adult laugh track, as was common practice at the time — the inclusion of which the Kroffts were initially against. Sid Krofft commented "We were sort of against that, but Si Rose — being in sitcoms — he felt that when the show was put together that the children would not know when to laugh." Marty Krofft added "the bottom line — it's sad — you gotta tell them when it's funny. And the laugh track, (Si) was right. It was necessary, as much as we were always looking to have a real laugh track, a real audience. In comedies, if you don't have them (laugh track), you're in big trouble, because if you don't hear a laugh track, it's not funny. And that's the way the audience (at home) was programmed to view these shows." When discussing the show's production techniques for the DVD commentary track in 2006, series stars Caroline Ellis and John Philpott addressed the laugh track. "I was never one for the American canned laughter, because sometimes it's too much," said Ellis. She added, however, that it does help in creating "the atmosphere for the reaction." Philpott added that, unlike their UK counterparts, US viewing audiences at the time had become accustomed to hearing laughter, saying, "I think you find yourself genuinely laughing more if you are prompted to laugh along with the canned laughter."

Characters

The Bugaloos
 I.Q. (John McIndoe) – a grasshopper who plays the guitar and sings lead vocals.
 Harmony (Wayne Laryea) – a bumblebee who plays the keyboard and sings backup vocals.
 Courage (John Philpott) – a ladybug who plays the drums and sings backup vocals.
 Joy (Caroline Ellis) – a butterfly who plays percussion and also sings lead and backup vocals.

Villains
 Benita Bizarre (Martha Raye) – a jealous, untalented, unattractive, evil old crone. Raye also appeared the same year in the H.R. Pufnstuf movie as the Boss Witch, which led to her getting the role of Benita.
 Funky Rat (performed by Sharon Baird, voiced by Walker Edmiston) – Benita's German-accented chauffeur and chief flunky. The Funky Rat costume was also used for essentially the same role as Boss Witch's Chauffeur Heinrich Rat in Pufnstuf.
 Woofer and Tweeter (performed by Joy Campbell and Van Snowden, voiced by Walker Edmiston and Joan Gerber) – two anthropomorphic stereo speakers who are Benita's two bumbling, sycophantic henchmen.

Supporting characters
 Sparky (performed by Billy Barty, voiced by Walker Edmiston) – a firefly whom the Bugaloos took in.
 Nutty Bird (voiced by Walker Edmiston) – a local messenger who periodically delivers messages to and from the Bugaloos.
 Peter Platter (voiced by Walker Edmiston) – a DJ for radio station KOOK in nearby Rock City.
Mike (voiced by Joan Gerber) – Peter Platters's smart-alecky talking microphone.
 Magico The Magician (voiced by Walker Edmiston, impersonating Ed Wynn) – a frog magician and hypnotist extraordinaire.
 Gina Lolawattage (voiced by Joan Gerber, impersonating Mae West) – a firefly singer and actress who becomes smitten with her #1 fan Sparky.
 Bluebell Flower (voiced by Joan Gerber) – a giant talking flower who alerts the Bugaloos of impending danger, such as Benita's latest schemes, serving as their "alarm bell".
 The Grapevine (voiced by Joan Gerber and Walker Edmiston) – a bunch of talking grapes who aid Bluebell in giving the Bugaloos the latest bad news (a visual take on the hit Motown song "I Heard it Through the Grapevine").

Music 

The show's music director was Hal Yoergler, who also wrote many of the show's songs and produced the Bugaloos album released in 1970. The title song's lyrics were written by Norman Gimbel, and its music was composed by Charles Fox. Gimbel and Fox were also the songwriters of "Killing Me Softly with His Song" and the theme songs to films and programs such as Last American Hero ("I Got A Name," sung by Jim Croce), Happy Days, Laverne and Shirley, and The New Adventures of Wonder Woman. A cover of the Bugaloos theme performed by Collective Soul is included on the 1995 tribute album Saturday Morning: Cartoons' Greatest Hits, produced by Ralph Sall for MCA Records.

The Bugaloos released an album in 1970 (Capitol Records ST-621), featuring studio-recorded versions of some of the songs performed on the show. The track list is as follows:

Side 1
 "If You Become a Bugaloo"
 "The Senses of Our World"
 "For a Friend"
 "Believe"
 "It's New to You"

Side 2
 "Fly Away With Us"
 "Older Woman"
 "Just the Memory Stays Around"
 "Gna Gna Gna Gna Gna"
 "Castles in the Air"
 "The Bugaloos (Theme Song)"

One single was released in conjunction with the album: "For a Friend"/"The Senses of Our World" (Capitol 2946). "For a Friend" charted as a minor hit, appearing on Billboard the week of December 18, 1970, at No. 118.

The track "Just the Memory Stays Around" did not appear in any episode, and is available only on the LP. The LP was re-released on CD in January 2000 by Vivid Sound in Japan and in 2006 by Cherry Red Records of London.

The Bugaloos recorded 15 songs. In addition to the 11 that appear on the released album, four additional songs appeared on the television show, but remain unreleased:
 "Sparky"
 "I'm As Happy As Can Be"
 "I Really Love You"
 "Flicker Town"

List of episodes

Home video
The complete Bugaloos series was released on DVD in May 2006 by Rhino Entertainment. The set contained all 17 digitally remastered, original uncut broadcast episodes, with audio commentary on the pilot episode from creator Sid Krofft and director Tony Charmoli. Cast members John Philpott, Caroline Ellis and John McIndoe also provided audio commentary on some episodes and participated in interviews. Also included were a video jukebox with a selection of songs from the episodes, a photo gallery and a Bugaloos Interactive I. Q. Test hosted by McIndoe.

Proposed Revival

At Comic Con 2015, Sid and Marty Krofft revealed they were looking to create an updated version of The Bugaloos as a preschool television series. It was rumored Cyndi Lauper would portray Benita Bizarre. At 2017's Comic Con, they released a teaser trailer of the pilot produced for Nickelodeon with clips of the new series with Lise Simms as Benita Bizarre. However, during a May 2018 radio interview with creator Marty Krofft, Marty revealed that the pilot was not picked up by Nickelodeon and was scrapped. He said they were reshooting the pilot and that Randy Jackson will be involved with the music.

In popular culture
The Bugaloos are the binding childhood memory that the two main protagonists in the 2000 film The Tao of Steve discover as they begin to bond, as Syd (Greer Goodman) and Dex (Donal Logue) find out that they both had Bugaloos stickers on their respective childhood Josie and the Pussycats lunchboxes.

The Bugaloos' song "Senses of Our World" was sampled by The Chemical Brothers in their track "The Darkness That You Fear".

See also
 The Monkees (1966–68)
Kidd Video (1984–85)

References

External links 
 
 World of Krofft, featuring "Krofft Kollectibles Museum"
 bugaloos.net/

1970s American children's comedy television series
1970s American musical comedy television series
1970 American television series debuts
1972 American television series endings
Television series about insects
Television series about teenagers
Fictional musical groups
Musical groups established in 1970
NBC original programming
Television series about radio
Television series based on singers and musicians
Television series by Sid and Marty Krofft Television Productions
Television series by CBS Studios
American television shows featuring puppetry